Middlesex 3 was an English level 12 Rugby Union league with teams from north-west London taking part.  Promoted teams moved up to Middlesex 2 and relegation was to Middlesex 4.  The division was cancelled at the end of the 1995–96 campaign after nine seasons due to the merger of the Hertfordshire and Middlesex regional leagues.

Original teams
When league rugby began in 1987 this division was split into two regional leagues containing the following teams:

North
Belsize Park
Enfield Old Grammarians
Haringey Rhinos
Kodak
Old Grammarians
Old Ignatians
Old Tottonians
Roxeth Manor Old Boys
S.T. and C.
UCS Old Boys
Wembley

South
Actonians
Bank of England
CAV
Feltham
Hammersmith & Fulham
Hayes
London French
Meadhurst
Old Isleworthians
Quintin

Middlesex 3 honours

Middlesex 3 North/South (1987–1988)

The original Middlesex 3 was a tier 10 league, split into two regional divisions (north and south).  Promotion was up to Middlesex 2 and there was no relegation.

Middlesex 3 (1987–1992)

The creation of Middlesex 4 ahead of the 1988–89 season saw Middlesex 3 merged into a single division remaining at tier 10 of the league structure.  Promotion continued to Middlesex 2, while relegation was to the new Middlesex 4.

Middlesex 3 (1992–1996)

The creation of Herts/Middlesex at the beginning of the 1992–93 season meant that Middlesex 3 dropped to become a tier 11 league.  The introduction of National 5 South for the 1993–94 season meant that Middlesex 3 dropped another level to become a tier 12 league for the years that National 5 South was active.  Promotion and relegation continued to Middlesex 2 and  Middlesex 4 respectively.  The merging of the Hertfordshire and Middlesex regional divisions at the end of the 1995–96 season meant that Middlesex 3 was cancelled.

Number of league titles

Bank of England (2)
Hammersmith & Fulham (1)
Haringey Rhinos (1)
London Exiles (1)
Old Grammarians (1)
Old Isleworthians (1)
Pinner & Grammarians (1)
Roxeth Manor Old Boys (1)
UCS Old Boys (1)

Notes

See also
London & SE Division RFU
Middlesex RFU
English rugby union system
Rugby union in England

References

Defunct rugby union leagues in England
Rugby union in Middlesex